James Kenneth Watson,  (August 12, 1904 – July 26, 1986) was a Canadian curler.

Biography
Watson was born in Minnedosa, Manitoba and moved to Winnipeg later. He was the first man to skip his rink to three Brier championships in 1936, 1942 and 1949.

After his career as a curler ended, he became a sports broadcaster, co-hosting CBC Championship Curling with Alex Trebek in 1966. He died in St. Boniface, Manitoba.

Honours
 1969 – inducted into the national Sports Hall of Fame
 1973 – elected to the Canadian Curling Hall of Fame
 1975 – made a Member of the Order of Canada
 1978 – Elmer Freytag Award
 1980 - inducted into the Manitoba Sports Hall of Fame and Museum
 2016 - designated a National Historic Person

Books
 Ken Watson on Curling, 1950

References

External links 
Ken Watson’s biography at Manitoba Sports Hall of Fame and Museum

1904 births
1986 deaths
Curlers from Winnipeg
Members of the Order of Canada
Curling broadcasters
Brier champions
People from Minnedosa, Manitoba
Persons of National Historic Significance (Canada)